Walter Murray Gibson (March 6, 1822 – January 21, 1888) was an American adventurer and a government minister in the Kingdom of Hawaii prior to the kingdom's 1887 constitution.

Early life
Gibson was generally thought to be born March 6, 1822, in the southern United States, though he sometimes claimed to have been born in England.
He spent his young adulthood in Anderson District, South Carolina.
He was the captain of a ship and became involved in gunrunning in the Caribbean. Later, he was jailed in the East Indies by the Dutch on charges of fomenting rebellion, was sentenced to death, but managed to escape from Weltevreden Prison in Java.
He claimed receiving a vision while in prison to "build up a kingdom in these isles, whose lines of power shall run around the earth."
In 1859, he went to Utah Territory and joined the Church of Jesus Christ of Latter-day Saints (LDS Church), persuading church president Brigham Young to allow him to establish a Mormon colony in the Pacific.

LDS Church colony
Gibson arrived in the Hawaiian Islands in 1861, and founded a colony among members of the LDS Church who were already in the islands. He purchased land on the island of Lanai with funds from the colony in his own name, but was excommunicated after an investigation by the church regarding accusations of preaching false doctrine, maladministration of the colony, and embezzlement of church funds. The proceedings leading to his excommunication were initiated by letters from Jonathan Napela and other Native Hawaiian church leaders to church headquarters in Salt Lake City. Upon excommunication, he expelled those who did not support him from his colony and church and began angling for secular political office and power.

Political career

In 1873, Gibson started his own newspaper to extol his virtues in English and Hawaiian called the Nuhou. He successfully ran for the House of Representatives in 1878
as a candidate of the King's Party, allying himself with King Kalakaua and portraying himself as the "voice of Hawaiians". In 1880 he bought the Pacific Commercial Advertiser (forerunner to the Honolulu Advertiser).

In 1882, he was appointed Minister of Foreign Affairs, and then on June 30, 1886, Prime Minister of the Kingdom of Hawaii by King Kalākaua. He also served on various boards, as Attorney General, Minister of the Interior, and Secretary of War. He often held several cabinet positions simultaneously, and at one point, the cabinet consisted of only him and Minister of Finance John Mākini Kapena, resulting in newspapers labeling him the "Minister of Everything".

Gibson was widely credited with encouraging Kalākaua to make rash political moves, which eventually led to the imposition of the 1887 Constitution of the Kingdom of Hawaii. One of his bolder plans included an attempt to build a Pacific empire, which drew the ire of both the international and local Hawaiian communities.
Sending the "homemade battleship" Kaimiloa to Samoa in 1887 resulted in suspicions from the German Navy and embarrassment for the conduct of the crew.

Personal life
On July 10, 1838, the sixteen-year old Gibson married the twenty-year old Rachel Margaret Lewis (1818–1844), daughter of Jesse and Hannah Lewis. Prior to their marriage, Gibson had been a boarder with the Lewis's in their home in Sandy Springs, outside of Pendleton, South Carolina. They had three children: John Lewis (1838–1877), Henry (died 1893) and Tallulah (later changed to the Hawaiianized Talula, 1843–1903), who married Sheriff of Maui Frederick H. Hayselden. Rachel died in 1844, possibly from the cold conditions of the family's cabin floors or complications from her last pregnancy.

Death
Gibson's fortunes fell dramatically after being removed from power in 1887. He fled the islands for fear of his life and died penniless in San Francisco on January 21, 1888. His body was returned to Hawaii for a funeral and burial.

Legacy
According to Samuel W. Taylor, Gibson was a brilliant, audacious imposter who manipulated the LDS Church and Brigham Young to his own advantage. Young named him as missionary-at-large to convert Japan and other Pacific islands. He had some success in Hawaii but was excommunicated by Young. He then turned to politics becoming Hawaii's chief minister. He plotted the revolution of 1887, but was overthrown and saved from execution by a British diplomat.

In film
Sam Neill played Gibson in the 1999 film Molokai: The Story of Father Damien.

References

Bibliography

 
 Taylor, Samuel W. "Walter Murray Gibson: Great Mormon Rascal" American West (00031534). (1964) 1#2 pp 18–28.

Further reading

External links

"A List of All the Cabinet Ministers Who Have Held Office in the Hawaiian Kingdom"

Includes a list of Attorneys General for the Kingdom of Hawaii, their salaries and budgets

1822 births
1888 deaths
19th-century American politicians
19th-century Mormon missionaries
American Latter Day Saint leaders
American Latter Day Saints
American Mormon missionaries
British Latter Day Saints
Editors of Hawaii newspapers
Exiles from Hawaii
Founders of new religious movements
Hawaiian Kingdom Attorneys General
Hawaiian Kingdom Foreign Ministers
Hawaiian Kingdom Interior Ministers
Hawaiian Kingdom Latter Day Saints
Hawaiian Kingdom politicians
Latter Day Saint leaders
Members of the Hawaii Board of Health
Members of the Hawaiian Kingdom House of Nobles
Members of the Hawaiian Kingdom House of Representatives
Members of the Hawaiian Kingdom Privy Council
Mormon missionaries in Hawaii
Mormonism and Pacific Islanders
National Party (Hawaii) politicians
People excommunicated by the Church of Jesus Christ of Latter-day Saints